Yao Yan (born 9 December 1974) is a retired Chinese badminton player from Nanning, Guangxi. She competed at the 1996 Summer Olympics.

Achievements

Asian Championships 
Women's singles

World Junior Championships 
Girls' singles

IBF World Grand Prix 
The World Badminton Grand Prix sanctioned by International Badminton Federation (IBF) since 1983.

Women's singles

References

External links 

1974 births
Living people
People from Nanning
Badminton players from Guangxi
Chinese female badminton players
Badminton players at the 1996 Summer Olympics
Olympic badminton players of China
Badminton players at the 1994 Asian Games
Asian Games bronze medalists for China
Asian Games medalists in badminton
Medalists at the 1994 Asian Games